David Bradley Lim (born September 23, 1983) is an American actor and model. He is best known for portraying the role of Sebastian Chen in the second season of the ABC thriller Quantico and as Victor Tan in the CBS television series S.W.A.T.

Early life and education
Lim was born on September 23, 1983 in Oakland, California, USA. He is an American born of Chinese descent. He graduated from De La Salle High School at Concord in 2001. In 2005, Lim earned a bachelor of science degree in Electrical Engineering from the University of California, San Diego.

Career 
Lim started his entertainment career as a model. In 2009, Lim signed a contract with Ford Models, and moved to Los Angeles shortly after to pursue modelling and acting.

In 2016, Lim was cast in the recurring role of CIA recruit Sebastian Chen on the second season of ABC thriller Quantico.

On April 13, 2017, Lim joined the cast of the CBS television series, S.W.A.T. On September 21, 2017, Lim was promoted to a series regular role, ahead of the premiere of the show. Lim stars in the role of S.W.A.T officer Victor Tan.

Personal life 
Lim's wife is Marketa Kazdova, a model.

Filmography

Film

Television

References

External links
 
 David Lim at rottentomatoes.com

1983 births
Living people
American people of Chinese descent
Male actors from California
American male film actors
21st-century American male actors
American male television actors
Male models from California